Vigo Auguste Demant  (1893–1983), known as V. A. Demant, was an English Anglican priest, theologian, and social commentator. He was one of the 14 committee members who served on the Wolfenden Report on Homosexual Offences and Prostitution.

Early life and education
Demant was born on 8 November 1893 in Newcastle upon Tyne, England. He was educated in Newcastle, England, and in Tournan, France. He studied engineering at Armstrong College, Durham. He then studied theology at Manchester College, Oxford.

Career

Ordained ministry and academia
Demant had originally intended to become a Unitarian minister, but became attracted to Catholicism while studying at the University of Oxford and was received into the Church of England in 1918. He trained for Holy Orders at Ely Theological College, an Anglo-Catholic theological college in Ely, Cambridgeshire.

Demant was ordained as a deacon in 1919 and as a priest in 1920. He served curacies at St Thomas the Martyr's Church, Oxford; St Michael and All Angels Church, Summertown, Oxford; St Nicholas' Church, Plumstead, London; and All Saints' Church, Highgate, London. From 1929 to 1933, he was an assistant priest at St Silas Church, Kentish Town.

Demant became Vicar of St John the Divine, Richmond, in 1933 and nine years later he became a canon of St Paul's Cathedral. He served as canon chancellor of the cathedral from 1942 to 1948 and as canon treasurer from 1948 to 1949. He was a canon of Christ Church, Oxford, and Regius Professor of Moral and Pastoral Theology at the University of Oxford from 1949 to 1971.

Other work
Demant served on the Committee on Homosexual Offences and Prostitution. The committee's report,  was published in September 1957 and,  recommended that "homosexual behaviour between consenting adults in private should no longer be a criminal offence."

Demant was a regular broadcaster on the BBC's Third Programme in the 1950s. He supported Maurice Reckitt in founding the Christendom Trust to encourage and fund research into the application of Christian social thought.

Later life
Demant retired from his post at Oxford to a cottage in Headington, Oxfordshire, in 1971. He died there on 3 March 1983 at the age of 89.

Writings

 The Just Price (1930)
 This Unemployment: Disaster or Opportunity? (1932)
 God, Man and Society: An Introduction to Christian Sociology (1933)
 Christian Polity (1936)
 The Religious Prospect (1939)
 Theology of Society: More Essays in Christian Polity (1947)
 Our Culture: Its Christian Roots and Present Crisis (1947)
 The Responsibility and Scope of Pastoral Theology To-Day (1950)
 Religion and the Decline of Capitalism (1952)
 The Elements of Christianity (1955)
 A Two-Way Religion (1957)
 Christian Sex Ethics (1963)
 The Idea of a Natural Order (1966)
 Why the Christian Priesthood Is Male (1972)

See also

 David Nicholls (theologian)
 Maurice Reckitt

References

Footnotes

Bibliography

 
 
 
 
 
 
 

1893 births
1983 deaths
20th-century English Anglican priests
20th-century English theologians
Alumni of Armstrong College, Durham
Alumni of Ely Theological College
Alumni of Harris Manchester College, Oxford
LGBT and Anglicanism
Anglo-Catholic clergy
Anglo-Catholic socialists
Anglo-Catholic theologians
British social crediters
Christian socialist theologians
English Anglican theologians
English Anglo-Catholics
English Christian socialists
Regius Professors of Moral and Pastoral Theology